Kevin Rivers is a male beach volleyball and volleyball player from Trinidad and Tobago.

He played in the men's competition at the NORCECA Beach Volleyball Circuit 2009 playing with Christian Francois

He won the 2008 National Beach Volleyball Championship playing with Christian Francois. The previous year he had won the silver medal playing with the same partner. They also won the bronze medal at the Sizzlin Sand Beach Volleyball Tour 2008 in Antigua

Playing Indoor volleyball, he participated in the 2006 Central American and Caribbean Games and Pan-American Cup 2008 with his National team.

Clubs
  West Side Stars (2009)

Awards

Individuals
 2007 Trinidad and Tobago A Division National League "Best Libero"
 2007 Trinidad and Tobago A Division National League "Best Digger"

National Team
 Trinidad and Tobago Beach Volleyball Championship 2008  Gold Medal
 Trinidad and Tobago Beach Volleyball Championship 2007  Silver Medal
 Sizzlin Sand Beach Volleyball Tour 2008 Antigua  Bronze Medal

References

External links
 

Year of birth missing (living people)
Living people
Trinidad and Tobago men's volleyball players
Trinidad and Tobago beach volleyball players
Men's beach volleyball players
Competitors at the 2006 Central American and Caribbean Games